Dee-Lightful is a studio album released by Lenny Dee in 1955 on Decca LP record DL 8114 and 45rpm Extended Play set ED-735.

Background
Organist Dee had an instrumental hit single in February 1955 with his composition Plantation Boogie.  This, his first album, contained that recording and Dee's interpretation of standards.  A 45-rpm extended play set was also issued, but missing four selections appearing on the 12-inch LP.

Reception
Billboard predicted that the album would be a "big seller", noting the large number of unusual sonic effects created on the organ, as well as the vivacity of Dee's playing. Cashbox listed the album as high as ninth on their album charts. On the Billboard albums chart, the album peaked at No. 11.

Track listing

References

1955 albums
Traditional pop albums
Instrumental albums
Decca Records albums